Neftçi Peşəkar Futbol Klubu, known simply as Neftçi or Neftchi Baku in English-speaking media, is an Azerbaijani football club based in the capital, Baku, that plays in the Azerbaijan Premier League, the highest tier of Azerbaijan football. The club was founded on 18 March 1937 and played under the name of Neftyanik until 1968. Since then he has been competing under the name of Neftçi.

Neftçi played for a total of 27 seasons in the Top Division of Soviet football. The main achievement of that period is the bronze medals of the USSR Championship won in 1966. Neftçi has won nine Azerbaijan Premier League titles, six Azerbaijan Cups and two Azerbaijan Supercup titles. The club is one of the two teams in Azerbaijan, along with Qarabağ, which has participated in all Azerbaijan Premier League championships so far.

In 2012, Neftçi became the first Azerbaijani club to advance to the group stage of a European competition after defeating APOEL 4–2 on aggregate in the play-off round of the 2012–13 UEFA Europa League. Neftçi plays its matches at the Bakcell Arena in Baku, which also serves as the venue for Azerbaijan national team matches.

History

Soviet era (1937–1991) 

The club was founded on 18 March 1937 and played under the name of Neftyanik until 1968. The first official match of Neftyanik took place on May 24, 1937. In the 1/64 finals of the Soviet Cup, Neftyanik won FC Dinamo Yerevan (1:0). The goal scored by Pavel Shtyrlin in the 87th minute was the first in the history of Neftçi.

The team, which has played since the USSR championships in the group G, took the 11th place among 12 participants. In the same year, in the matches for the USSR Cup, Neftyanik, although he won in 1/64 and 1/32 finals in the Dinamo teams from Yerevan and Batumi, lost in the 1/16 finals from the fight, losing to the Dinamo Tbilisi.

Between 1938 and 1941, Neftyanik also played in local Azerbaijani and Caucasus championships. At the start of World War II, the players had to join the army. Mirmehdi Aghayev, who played for the club before the war, was among those killed in action. As the war drew to an end, the team gradually resumed operations and in 1944, Neftyanik returned to the Azerbaijani championship, becoming champions the following year.

Neftyanik competed in the 2nd Group of the USSR championship in 1946–1948, and was qualified for the first time in its history for the 1st Group (Top League) in 1949. After Temp Baku which took part only one year in the 1st Group eleven years ago, Neftyanik became the second representative of the Republic in that level in the history of Azerbaijan football. The first Top League match was against the VVS Moscow at the then Lenin Stadium (now Ismat Gayibov Stadium). In this historic match, the team won with a score of 1:0. The first goal in group A of the championship of the USSR was recorded by Viktor Anoshkin. They finished the Top Division in 14th place in their debut season. Playing in the Top Division for two consecutive years, Neftyanik left it in 1950 and had to play in the Class B again. The team was qualified for the second time in its history for the Top League in 1960, and by playing regularly in the Top League during 1960–1965.

The 1966 season stands out in the history of Neftçi, as the club achieved its biggest success in the USSR championships by finishing third. By beating Spartak Moscow 3:0 in the last game of the championship in the current Tofiq Bahramov Republican Stadium on 30 November, the Black and Whites, coached by 31-year-old Ahmad Alaskarov, reached 45 points and finished only two points short of the Rostov Army Club who were second. Dynamo Kyiv won the championship with 56 points. Two years later, in 1968, the club began the 30th USSR championship as Neftçi rather than Neftyanik.

Neftçi dropped to the Second Division in 1972 and spent the 1973–76 seasons there. Elbrus Abbasov played a great role in the team's comeback. By scoring 28 goals, he became the Second Division's top scorer, helping the Black and Whites finish second and qualify for the top flight again. In 1987 season, Neftçi coached by Aghasalim Mirjavadov, finished the championship in 9th place, registering its best performance since 1971. The team was known for its attacking trio which included Isgandar Javadov, Mashalla Ahmadov and Igor Ponomaryov. 1988 was a disappointing season for the club, as they finished 15th and were relegated to the Second Division. Aghasalim Mirjavadov coached them in the first half of the season and Yuriy Kuznetsov in the second, but neither could save the team from relegation.

Domestic hegemony (1991–2012) 

Neftçi won the first Azerbaijani national championship having begun as clear favourites, since many of the players playing for the club at the end of the Soviet period remained. The team was coached by Ahmad Alaskarov. Another success came three years later. In 1995, Neftçi, led by Vagif Sadygov, defeated all rivals in the fight for the Cup of Azerbaijan. 1995–1996 season Neftçi finished with a "golden double" — won the national championship and became the owner of the Cup. This success was achieved thanks to the efforts of coaches Vagif Sadygov, Asif Aliyev and Kazbek Tuaev.

In 2006, Neftçi managed to win the CIS Cup after defeating FBK Kaunas of Lithuania in the final. In European competitions, the club also have advanced to the second qualifying round of the UEFA Champions League twice, having defeated Bosnian champions – NK Široki Brijeg – and Icelandic champions – FH Hafnarfjarðar – in 2004 and 2005 respectively.  Neftçi advanced to the third round of the 2008 Intertoto Cup, after defeating the Slovak club FC Nitra and the Belgian side K.F.C. Germinal Beerschot in the first two rounds.

A long period of decline followed the success of the 2005 to the end of the decade. Despite the appointment of famous names such as Gurban Gurbanov, Vlastimil Petržela, Anatoliy Demyanenko and Hans-Jürgen Gede, the club did not achieve any success and squandered large sums of money on unsuccessful signings.

Prospects changed positively in December 2009 when the club's control was given to Sadıq Sadıqov. The takeover was immediately followed by a flurry of bids for high-profile international players such as Bahodir Nasimov, Nicolás Canales, Flavinho, Bruno Bertucci, Eric Ramos, Igor Mitreski and Julius Wobay. In May 2011, coached by Arif Asadov, the club won its sixth championship title. Asadov also become first person in Azerbaijan to win the league title as a coach and football player. However, Asadov was dismissed after the defeat to Dinamo Zagreb in the qualifying round of the Champions League 2011–2012 season.

In the 2011–12 season, Boyukagha Hajiyev guided Neftçi to another domestic success as club become champions for seventh time in their history. In November 2011, Neftçi celebrated its 1,000th victory in official matches and its 1,000th goal in Azerbaijan League, scored by Araz Abdullayev.

European breakthrough (2012–present) 

In 2012, Neftçi qualified for the 2012–13 UEFA Europa League group stage, being the first Azerbaijani team to advance to this stage in a European competition. Neftçi managed to get three points in six matches, drawing with Partizan both times and holding Internazionale away at the San Siro.

A third consecutive Premier League title followed in 2012–13. Neftçi then won the Azerbaijan Cup on 28 May 2013 to secure the domestic double. Following Neftçi's early exit from European cups, Boyukagha Hajiyev resigned from his post. Following defeat at 2013 Azerbaijan Supercup, Nazim Suleymanov was appointed as Neftçi's new manager after Tarlan Ahmadov was sacked just three months in charge. On 8 January 2014, Suleymanov resigned as manager after a transfer fund dispute. In May 2014, despite finishing fourth, Neftçi managed to win Azerbaijan Cup. In August 2014, the club reached Europa League play-off round after defeating Chikhura Sachkhere on aggregate.

On 2 November 2014, Neftçi club president Sadygov stated that the club was experiencing financial difficulties. In 2015, it was announced that the club would become a public limited company – Neftchi PLC, while the club's new president would be Chingiz Abdullayev.

On 8 June 2018, Roberto Bordin was announced as Neftçi's new manager on a two-year contract. Under the head coach of Roberto Bordin, the team finished Azerbaijan Premier League in second place and they have advanced two qualifying rounds in the UEFA Europa League. On 18 January 2020, the club officially announced that the contract with Bordin mutually terminated and he was replaced temporarily by his assistant Fizuli Mammadov.

On 11 November 2020, Samir Abbasov was appointed manager. The contract between the parties was signed until the end of the 2021/2022 season. In the first season under his coach, the club won the Azerbaijan Premier league after 7 years again.

Grounds 

Neftçi's home matches are usually played at Tofiq Bahramov Stadium in Baku. Built by German prisoners of war in 1951 and constructed in the shape of a "C" to honour Joseph Stalin, it was renamed after famous football referee Tofiq Bahramov in 1993 after his death. The stadium also serves as the home ground of the Azerbaijan national football team and holds 31,200 spectators, making it the second largest stadium in the country.

Neftçi's current home venue is the 11,000 capacity Bakcell Arena. It has been the club's home since the 2012–13 season.

Supporters 

Neftçi is one of the most supported clubs in Azerbaijan, with supporters organized in many fan clubs around the world, including the United States, Turkey, Russia and any other country with a sizeable Azerbaijani community. Neftçi's fans are the first to bring Ultras Culture to Azerbaijan. Various companies were Neftçi's number of participating groups. Among them are "Flaqman", "Ultra Neftçi", "Neftçimania" and Forza Neftçi. Currently, the biggest fan group of the club is "Forza Neftçi". In the 2010s, although Neftçi improved its position, the average attendance fell to record low levels.

The club's most popular celebrity supporters are the likes of actors Bahram Bagirzade, Bashir Safaroglu and Lutfali Abdullayev, composers Gara Garayev, Fikrat Amirov and Niyazi, judoka Ilham Zakiyev and scientist Mirali Qashqai.

Rivalry with Khazar Lankaran

Matches between Neftçi and Khazar Lankaran are some of the biggest clashes in Azerbaijan. The relationship between the two clubs has always been known for its great animosity, as the classic opposes two geographic regions – with Neftçi and Khazar Lankaran representing the north and south of Azerbaijan, respectively.

Recent seasons 
Statistics from the previous decade. For a full history see; List of Neftçi PFK seasons

Key
Rank = Rank in the league; P = Played; W = Win; D = Draw; L = Loss; F = Goals for; A = Goals against; GD = Goal difference; Pts = Points; Cup = Azerbaijan Cup; CL = UEFA Champions League; EL = UEFA Europa League; ECL = UEFA Europa Conference League.
in = Still in competition; – = Not attended; 1R = 1st round; 2R = 2nd round; 3R = 3rd round; 1QR = 1st qualifying round; 2QR = 2nd qualifying round; 3QR = 3rd qualifying round; PO = Play-off round; GS = Group stage; R16 = Round of sixteen; QF = Quarter-finals; SF = Semi-finals.

Crest and colours 
In 1937 Baku had already gained a reputation as an oil city. Therefore, those working in the field of "black gold" soon formed a football team on 18 March 1937. But they didn't have to think much about the name. They gave own names to the team. The color of "black gold" also formed the basis of the form. At that time, along with oil, cotton, called "white gold", played no less a role in the glory of the Azerbaijani SSR than oil, so it was decided that the color of cotton should be reflected in the form. Since then, Neftçi, has remained faithful to black-white.

1949 means for history of Neftçi not less than the year of its establishment. That year taking part under the name Neftyanik, the club was qualified for the first time in its history for the Soviet Top League. A radical changes were made in the staff of Neftyanik with the aim to provide successes of the team among Football elite. Also the team logotype was made. The emblem was the letter "Н" of the Cyrillic Alphabet against the background of an oil rig – the first letter of the word Neftyannik. The logo of Neftçi has been changed three times, in 1977, 1997 and in 2004.

Shirt sponsors and kit manufacturers

Neftçi's traditional kit was composed of black shirts, white shorts and socks of the same colour. Although through the years these two have gone from alternating between white and black stripes.

European record 

The club have participated in 21 editions of the club competitions governed by UEFA, the chief authority for football across Europe. These include 7 seasons in the Champions League, 13 seasons in the UEFA Cup and Europa League, two seasons in the UEFA Europa Conference League and one seasons in the Cup Winners' Cup and Intertoto Cup. Counting all of the 74 games the side have played in UEFA competitions since their first entry into the Cup Winners' Cup in the 1995–96 season, the team's record stands at 25 wins, 19 draws and 34 defeats.

Matches

Players

Current squad 

For recent transfers, see Transfers summer 2022.

Out on loan

Reserve team
Neftçi-2 plays in the Azerbaijan First Division from 2018.

Honours

Azerbaijan

Azerbaijan League
 Winners (9): 1992, 1995–96, 1996–97, 2003–04, 2004–05, 2010–11, 2011–12, 2012–13, 2020–21
 Runners-up (4): 2000–01, 2006–07, 2018–19, 2019–20
 Third place (6): 1994–95, 1998–99, 1999–2000, 2005–06, 2007–08, 2017–18
Azerbaijan Cup
 Winners (6): 1994–95, 1995–96, 1998–99, 2003–04, 2012–13, 2013–14
 Runners-up (4): 2000–01, 2011–12, 2014–15, 2015–16
Azerbaijan Supercup
 Winners (2): 1993, 1995
 Runners-up (1): 2013

USSR
Soviet Top League
 Third place (1): 1966
Soviet First League
 Runners-up (1): 1976
 Third place (1): 1954
Soviet Cup
 Semi-finalist (4): 1966–67, 1967–68, 1970, 1971
USSR Federation Cup
Runners-up (1): 1988

European
 UEFA Intertoto Cup
Runners-up (1): 2008 (joint runners-up)

International
 Commonwealth of Independent States Cup
Winners (1): 2006
Runners-up (1): 2005

Coaches and administration

Presidential history 
Neftçi has had numerous presidents over the course of its history, some of whom have been owners of the club while others have been honorary presidents. In 1988, Neftçi had registered as a professional football club and club since then had eight presidents.

Notable managers

The following individuals have all won at least one trophy while coaching Neftçi:

References

Further reading

External links 

 Official Website 
 Youtube channel

 
Football clubs in Baku
Association football clubs established in 1937
1937 establishments in Azerbaijan
Soviet Top League clubs
Works association football teams